Acacia lumholtzii, also known as Girringun wattle, is a shrub of the genus Acacia and the subgenus Plurinerves that is endemic to a small area of north eastern Australia. It is listed a vulnerable according to the Nature Conservation Act 1992.

Description
Like most species of Acacia it has phyllodes rather than true leaves.

Taxonomy
The species was first formally described in 2006 by the botanist Leslie Pedley as part of the work Notes on Acacia Mill. (Leguminosae: Mimosoideae), chiefly from Queensland as published in the journal Austrobaileya.

Distribution
It is confined to small area in Girringun National Park on Bishop Peak located to the south of Cardwell in Queensland where it is often situated on rack pavements and cliffs composed of granite.

See also
List of Acacia species

References

lumholtzii
Flora of Queensland
Taxa named by Leslie Pedley
Plants described in 2006